A referendum on the reduction of the Senate was held in the United States Virgin Islands on 7 November 2000. Voters were first asked if they wanted to reduce the size of the Senate from its current membership of 15. They were then asked the reduced size of Senate that they preferred – either nine or eleven seats. While a reduction was overwhelmingly approved and voters chose a reduction to nine seats, the referendum was non-binding and was not implemented.

Results
Favor Reduction of Senate

11 or 9 Seats in reduced Senate

References

2000 referendums
Referendums in the United States Virgin Islands
2000 elections in the Caribbean
2000 in the United States Virgin Islands